Pambrun is an unincorporated community in Saskatchewan, Canada, 61 km southeast of the city of Swift Current. It is located on Highway 43 in the Rural Municipality of Whiska Creek No. 106.

The community is home to the Millar College of the Bible, which employs most of the community's population.

In previous years Pambrun was home to a car dealership.

References 

Unincorporated communities in Saskatchewan